Inbiocystiscus is a genus of minute sea snail, a marine gastropod mollusc in the family Cystiscidae.

Species
Species within the genus Inbiocystiscus include:
Inbiocystiscus faroi Ortea & Espinosa, 2006
Inbiocystiscus gamezi Ortea & Espinosa, 2001
Inbiocystiscus tanialeonae Ortea & Espinosa, 2016
Inbiocystiscus triplicatus Espinosa & Ortea, 2007

References 

 
Cystiscidae